Ali Lamine Kab (born March 11, 1985) is an Algerian football player. He currently plays for CA Bordj Bou Arreridj in the Algerian Ligue Professionnelle 1.

References

External links
 

1985 births
Living people
Algerian footballers
USM Alger players
CA Batna players
CA Bordj Bou Arréridj players
Algerian Ligue Professionnelle 1 players
Algeria under-23 international footballers
USM El Harrach players
CS Constantine players
USM Bel Abbès players
Association football forwards
21st-century Algerian people